is a Japanese football player.

Club statistics

References

External links

1990 births
Living people
Association football people from Saitama Prefecture
Japanese footballers
J1 League players
J2 League players
Japan Football League players
Kashiwa Reysol players
Blaublitz Akita players
Montedio Yamagata players
Association football midfielders